Leendert "Len" de Goey (born 29 February 1952) is a Dutch former footballer who played as a midfielder. Born in Amsterdam, The Netherlands, De Goey began his playing career with Telstar where he spent one season before moving to Sparta Rotterdam in 1976.  After three years with Rotterdam he was signed by English side Sheffield United for £125,000 in August 1979 as they tried to build a side capable of achieving promotion from Division Three.  De Goey made his United debut in a League Cup game against Doncaster Rovers a few days after signing, and although showing initial promise, both his and the team's form deteriorated as the season progressed.  Deemed surplus to requirements, De Goey returned to Holland in the summer of 1980, with Go Ahead Eagles paying a minimal fee for him, where he played for a further two seasons before retiring.

Trivia 
"Len de Goey" is an anagram of GoldenEye.

References

1952 births
Living people
Footballers from Amsterdam
Dutch footballers
Association football midfielders
SC Telstar players
Sparta Rotterdam players
Sheffield United F.C. players
Go Ahead Eagles players
Eerste Divisie players
English Football League players
Dutch expatriate sportspeople in England